The Rector House is a historic house at 603 West Quitman Street in Heber Springs, Arkansas.  It is a roughly rectangular single-story wood-frame structure, with a gable-on-hip roof that is on two sides extended at a lower slope across a wraparound porch.  The porch is supported by Tuscan columns set on brick piers.  To the right of the main entrance (which is accessed via the porch) is a projecting gabled section, with a small square window in the gable, flanked by vents and topped by a mini-gable.  The house was built in 1915–16, and is considered a good example of the "Free Classic" form of Queen Anne architecture.

The house was listed on the National Register of Historic Places in 2008.

See also
National Register of Historic Places listings in Cleburne County, Arkansas

References

Houses on the National Register of Historic Places in Arkansas
Queen Anne architecture in Arkansas
Houses completed in 1915
Houses in Cleburne County, Arkansas